Shrapnel, in comics, may refer to:

Shrapnel (DC Comics), a DC Comics supervillain
Shrapnel (Radical Comics), a series of science fiction limited series from Radical Comics
Shrapnel (Transformers), a character in Transformers who has appeared in the comic book adaptations

See also
Shrapnel (disambiguation)